Poitín, anglicized as poteen or potcheen, is a traditional Irish distilled beverage (40–90% ABV). Former common names for Poitín were "Irish moonshine" and "mountain dew". It was traditionally distilled in a small pot still and the term is a diminutive of the Irish word pota, meaning "pot". The Irish word for a hangover is póit. In accordance with the Irish Poteen/Irish Poitín technical file, it can only be made from cereals, grain, whey, sugar beet, molasses and potatoes.

Legal status
To authorise the distillation of spirits a requirement was introduced at the parliament at Drogheda in 1556 which necessitated a licence under the great seal.

Today in Ireland there are a number of commercially produced spirits labelled as poitín, poteen or potcheen. In 2008, Irish poitín was accorded (GI) Geographical Indicative Status by the EU Council and Parliament.

In 2015, in consultation with producers and stakeholders, the Irish Government adopted the Geographical Indication technical file for poitín, outlining the production methods that must be used in order for a spirit to be called Irish Poitín. Topics covered included allowable base materials, distillation method, use of flavourings/infusions and limited storage in casks.

However, the notion of "legal poitín" has been viewed as an oxymoron by some, one writer observing, "If you see a product labelled 'poteen' in an airport or a bar, it's simply a white duty-paid Irish schnapps. By definition, poteen is illegal and can't be sold."

Poitín was also produced in the growing Irish diaspora in the 19th century, particularly in any of the New York City neighborhoods dubbed "Irishtown".

Production

Poitín was generally produced in remote rural areas, away from the interference of the law. A mash was created and fermented before the distillation began. Stills were often set up on land boundaries so the issue of ownership could be disputed. Prior to the introduction of bottled gas, the fire to heat the wash was provided by turf. Smoke was a giveaway for the police, so windy, broken weather was chosen to disperse the smoke. The still was heated and attended to for several days to allow the runs to go through.

The old style of poitín distilling was from a malted barley base for the mash, the same as single malt whiskey or pure pot still whiskey distilled in Ireland. The word poitín stems from the Irish word "pota" for pot; this refers to the small copper pot still used by poitín distillers.

In more recent times, some distillers deviated from using malted barley as a base of the mash bill due to the cost and availability instead switching to using treacle, corn and potatoes. It is believed this switch led to the deteriorating quality and character of poitín in the late 20th century.

The quality of poitín was highly variable, depending on the skill of the distiller and the quality of their equipment. Reputations were built on the quality of the distiller's poitín, and many families became known for their distilling expertise, where a bad batch could put a distiller out of business overnight. It has been claimed that the drink can cause blindness but this is possibly due to adulteration and presence of methanol rather than lack of quality.

Literature and traditional music

Poitín is a trope in Irish poetry and prose of the nineteenth century. The Irish critic Sinéad Sturgeon has demonstrated how the illegality of the substance became a crucial theme running through the works of Maria Edgeworth and William Carlton. Many characters in the work of contemporary Irish playwright Martin McDonagh consume or refer to poitín, most notably the brothers in The Lonesome West. In the Saga of Darren Shan book The Lake of Souls the character Spits Abrams brews his own poitín. In Frank McCourt's book 'Tis, he recalls his mother Angela telling him that when his brother Malachy visited her in Limerick, he obtained poitín in the countryside and drank it with her.

Some traditional Irish folk songs, such as The Hills of Connemara and The Rare Old Mountain Dew, deal with the subject of poitín. The folk song "Tinkers' Potcheen" by Seamus Moore recounts the way in which the practice of producing poitín is passed down through families. The persecution of the poitín-maker by the Royal Irish Constabulary in 1880s Cavan is treated in The Hackler from Grouse Hall and its reply The Sergent's Lamentation. In the first song, an overzealous sergeant pursued an ageing hackler with a fondness for poitín.

See also

Irish whiskey
Moonshine
Pure pot still whiskey

References

External links

 Detailed list of the types of Poteen
 What is Poitín?

Distilled drinks
Irish cuisine
Irish whiskey